Kazan Cathedral or Kazanskiy Kafedralniy Sobor, also known as the Cathedral of Our Lady of Kazan, is a cathedral of the Russian Orthodox Church on the Nevsky Prospekt in Saint Petersburg. It is dedicated to Our Lady of Kazan, one of the most venerated icons in Russia.

Background
Construction of the cathedral started in 1801 and continued for ten years under the supervision of Alexander Sergeyevich Stroganov. Upon its completion in 1811, the new temple replaced the Church of Nativity of the Theotokos, which was disassembled when the Kazan Cathedral was consecrated.

The architect Andrey Voronikhin modelled the building on St. Peter's Basilica in Rome. Some art historians assert that Emperor Paul (reigned 1796–1801) intended to build a similar church on the other side of Nevsky Prospect that would mirror the Kazan Cathedral, but such plans failed to materialize. Although the Russian Orthodox Church strongly disapproved of the plans to create a replica of a Catholic basilica in Russia's then capital, several courtiers supported Voronikhin's Empire Style design.

After Napoleon invaded Russia (1812) and the commander-in-chief General Mikhail Kutuzov asked Our Lady of Kazan for help, the church's purpose altered. The Patriotic War over, Russians saw the cathedral primarily as a memorial to their victory over Napoleon. Kutuzov himself was interred in the cathedral in 1813; and Alexander Pushkin wrote celebrated lines meditating over his sepulchre. In 1815 keys to seventeen cities and eight fortresses were brought by the victorious Russian army from Europe and placed in the cathedral's sacristy. In 1837, Boris Orlovsky designed two bronze statues of Kutuzov and of Barclay de Tolly which stand in front of the cathedral.

In 1876 the Kazan demonstration, the first political demonstration in Russia, took place in front of the church. After the Russian Revolution of 1917 the authorities closed the cathedral (January 1932). In November 1932 it reopened as the pro-Marxist "Museum of the History of Religion and Atheism". or, as one contemporary writer put it, "Leningrad's largest antireligious museum", complete with Spanish Inquisition waxworks. Services resumed in 1992, and four years later the cathedral was returned to the Russian Orthodox Church.  it functions as the mother cathedral of the metropolis of St. Petersburg.
 
The cathedral's interior, with its numerous columns, echoes the exterior colonnade and is reminiscent of a palatial hall, being 69 metres in length and 62 metres in height. The interior features numerous sculptures and icons created by the best Russian artists of the day. A wrought-iron grille separating the cathedral from a small square behind it is sometimes cited as one of the finest ever constructed.

The cathedral's huge bronze doors are one of four copies of the original doors of the Baptistery in Florence, Italy (the other three are at Grace Cathedral in San Francisco, United States, at the Nelson-Atkins Museum of Art in Kansas City, United States, and at the Florence Baptistery itself).

The Kazan Cathedral is considered to be the model for the neoclassical style of Helsinki Cathedral, one of the most iconic landmarks of Helsinki, Finland.

See also
 List of tallest domes
 List of largest Orthodox cathedrals
Our Lady of Kazan
Kazan Cathedral, Moscow

References

Sources

External links

Churches completed in 1811
Cathedrals in Saint Petersburg
Defunct museums in Russia
St Petersburg
Tourist attractions in Saint Petersburg
Nevsky Prospekt
Andrey Voronikhin buildings
Auguste de Montferrand buildings and structures
Vasily Stasov buildings and structures
Church buildings with domes
Cultural heritage monuments of federal significance in Saint Petersburg
Neoclassical church buildings in Russia